Lindsay Davenport and Liezel Huber were the defending champions, but only Huber chose to participate.
She played alongside Lisa Raymond and they reached the final.

There Victoria Azarenka and Maria Kirilenko won the title, defeating the American pair 6–1, 6–3.

Seeds

Draw

Draw

External links
 Doubles draw

Bank of the West Classic - Doubles